Ayabadhu (Ayapathu), or Badhu, is an extinct Australian Aboriginal language of the Paman family spoken on the Cape York Peninsula of North Queensland, Australia by the Ayapathu people. The Ayabadhu language region includes the Cook Shire and the areas around Coen and Port Stewart.

Verstraete and Rigsby (2015) determined that Ayabadhu and Yintyingka, spoken by the Yintyingka and Lamalama and previously known as coastal Ayapathu, are closely related and dialects of the same language. They also found these dialects to be "structurally different" to Western Ayapathu. The name Yintjinggu/Jintjingga has been used for both Ayabadhu and the neighboring Umbindhamu language.

Vocabulary 
Some words from the Ayabadhu language, as spelt and written by Ayabadhu authors include:

 'Agu: land
 'Eka: head
 Kaleny: uncle
 Kangka: leaf
 Ko'on: magpie goose
 Kuche: two
 Mayi: food
 Punga: sun
 Wanthi punga: good day

References 

Wik languages
Extinct languages of Queensland